"Les rues de ma peine" is a song performed by French-Israeli singer Amir Haddad. The song was released as a digital download on 9 February 2018 as the second single from his third studio album Addictions (2017). The song has peaked at number 63 on the French Singles Chart and also charted in Belgium.

Commercial performance
On 17 February 2018, the song entered the French Singles Chart at number 166, peaking at number 63.

Music video
A music video to accompany the release of "Les rues de ma peine" was first released onto YouTube on 9 February 2018 at a total length of three minutes and forty-six seconds.  It was filmed in Hong Kong.

Track listing

Charts

Weekly charts

Year-end charts

Release history

References

2017 songs
2018 singles
Amir Haddad songs
Songs written by Nazim Khaled
Songs written by Amir Haddad